David Moir may refer to:

David Moir (bishop) (died 1847), Scottish Episcopal bishop
David Macbeth Moir (1798–1851), Scottish physician and writer
David Moir (footballer) (1897–1969), English footballer

See also
 Moir (surname)
 Moir (disambiguation)